Kailin Chio (born July 4, 2006) is an American artistic gymnast and former member of the USA national gymnastics team.  She is the 2021 Junior Pan American Games champion on floor exercise.

Early life 
Chio was born to Sara and Nathan Chio in 2006 in Henderson, Nevada.  She started gymnastics in 2009.

Gymnastics career

Junior

2021 
Chio competed at the American Classic where she finished first in the all-around.  In late May she competed at the U.S. Classic where she placed second in the all-around behind Katelyn Jong.  In June Chio competed at the U.S. National Championships.  She ended the two day competition fifth in the all-around.  She won gold on vault and bronze on floor exercise.  As a result Chio was added to the national team for the first time.  Additionally she was selected to represent the United States at the Junior Pan American Championships alongside Jong, Madray Johnson, and Kaliya Lincoln.

At the Junior Pan American Championships Chio helped the USA finish first in the team final.  Individually she won silver on the floor exercise behind compatriot Lincoln.

In November Chio was selected to represent the United States at the inaugural Junior Pan American Games alongside Katelyn Jong, Madray Johnson, and Tiana Sumanasekera.  While there the United States placed first as a team and individually Chio won gold on floor exercise, silver in the all-around behind Jong, and bronze on uneven bars behind Johnson and Aurélie Tran of Canada.

Senior

2022–23 
Chio became age-eligible for senior competition in 2022.  However, she did not compete during the season due to injury.  In October she verbally committed to compete for the LSU Tigers gymnastics team starting in the 2024–25 season.

On January 9, 2023 Chio announced on her Instagram that she had retired from elite level gymnastics and would be competing Level 10.

Competitive history

References

External links
 
 

2006 births
Living people
American female artistic gymnasts
U.S. women's national team gymnasts
Sportspeople from Las Vegas
21st-century American women
People from Henderson, Nevada